HaAh HaGadol 2 (lit. The Big Brother 2) is the second series of the Israeli version of the reality show Big Brother. The show was first broadcast on 15 November 2009, and ended on 4 March 2010. Sixteen housemates entered the house on launch night and another five joining after 43 days. The housemates competed for a one million shekel prize. The house was located in Neve Ilan, a suburb of Jerusalem. The twist this season was that the house was split in half, the same concept used in Big Brother 9 (UK), and the introduction of the Head of House.

Housemates

Byrdie
Byrdie Bell, a 24-year-old woman from New York City. She is an American actress who entered the house on Day 71. She is a fake housemate, and the housemates believe she was evicted from the US edition of Big Brother, to be sent to the Israeli house. The housemates also believe the public will be voting on whether or not Byrdie should stay in the house as a housemate or be evicted. She left the house on Day 74.

Notes

Nominations table

Notes

 Alin, Aviv, Moti, Ma'ayan and Sarah were immune from eviction after winning a secret mission (Hide the fact that Ma'ayan and Moti are a married couple). Ma'ayan was nominated for eviction after breaking the house rules.
 Dana, Edna, Hila, Tamara and Tomer were immune from being nominated because they are new housemates.
 Housemates nominated who they wanted to stay in the house and the three housemates with the most votes got immunity.  For the first time in this season, two housemates were evicted from the Big Brother house.
 This week was a Fake Week, similar to the Fake Week in Big Brother 8 UK. A fake housemate entered named Byrdie with a chance to become an actual Big Brother Israel housemate; she was evicted. On Day 77, Eliraz was evicted and interviewed by the show's hosts and then put back into the house.
 In week 15, any housemate who got at least one vote, was nominated for eviction.
 There were no nominations in the final week and the public was voting for housemates to win, rather than be evicted. the housemate with the most SMS votes was the winner.

External links
 Official website 

2009 Israeli television seasons
2010 Israeli television seasons
02